Brian Irvine (born 24 May 1965 in Bellshill, Scotland) is a former international footballer who played as a central defender for Falkirk, Aberdeen, Dundee, Ross County and managed Elgin City. He was capped nine times by Scotland.

Career
After working in a bank on leaving school, Irvine began his professional career with Falkirk in 1983, aged 18. During his spell with the Bairns, he became an evangelical Christian.

After two years and nearly forty league appearances at Brockville, Irvine moved to Aberdeen, the team he had supported as a child, for a fee of £110,000. During twelve years with the Dons, Irvine made over 350 appearances in all competitions, gradually becoming a regular in the defence alongside Alex McLeish as veteran captain Willie Miller's career came to an end.

Aberdeen won the Scottish Cup in 1990, with Irvine scoring the winning penalty in a 9–8 shootout win against Celtic in the final, having also scored in the quarter-final and semi-final. He had already come on as a substitute in the League Cup final victory in the same season, and played a part in two other finals and five runners-up finishes in the Scottish Premier Division (losing out to Rangers on every occasion), as well as helping the club avoid what would have been a first-ever relegation via a play-off in 1995. He took over in goals in emergencies (if the goalkeeper was injured or sent off) on several occasions, saving a penalty in a match against Hibernian in 1991.

In June 1995 he was diagnosed  with multiple sclerosis, returning to action four months after the diagnosis. Irvine left Pittodrie in 1997 (following a testimonial match against Wimbledon) and moved to Dundee, featuring nearly 70 times in two years. In 1999, Irvine moved to Ross County, where he finished his playing career in 2003.

Coaching career / later work
After retiring, Irvine stayed with County as a coach, taking his first managerial job in January 2006 with Elgin City. In December that year, with the club bottom of the table, Irvine left the club. In March 2009, Irvine was named assistant manager to Martin Rennie of USL First Division side Carolina RailHawks FC. He was previously Rennie's assistant at USL-2 side Cleveland City Stars.

He has been involved in charity work, and in 2016 became a police officer.

Career statistics

Club

International

Managerial record

Honours
Aberdeen
Scottish Premier Division: Runners-up 1988–89, 1989–90, 1990–91, 1992–93, 1993–94
Scottish Cup: 1989–90
Runners-up 1992–93
Scottish League Cup: 1989–90
Runners-up 1988–89

See also
 List of footballers in Scotland by number of league appearances (500+)

References

External links 
 
 

1965 births
Footballers from Bellshill
Aberdeen F.C. players
Elgin City F.C. managers
Dundee F.C. players
Falkirk F.C. players
Living people
Ross County F.C. players
Scotland international footballers
Scottish footballers
Scottish Premier League players
Scottish football managers
Scottish Football League players
Association football central defenders
Scottish Football League managers
Scottish evangelicals
People with multiple sclerosis
Scottish police officers
Scottish expatriate sportspeople in the United States
Outfield association footballers who played in goal
Police Scotland officers